The Solent Kestrels are an English professional basketball club based in the city of Southampton, Hampshire. Founded in 1998, the Kestrels play their home games at the Solent Sports Complex at Solent University, and compete in NBL Division 1, the second tier of the British basketball system.

History

Junior roots
The club was founded in 1998 by Jimmie and Bev Guymon, who wanted somewhere for their son and other youngsters in the area to play competitive basketball. Originally set up to offer junior basketball to boys teams from under-13's to under-18's, the club offers junior basketball to boys and girls from under-10 up to under-18 National League level. The girls program was introduced in 2001, an initiative of Ollie Jerram and Bev Guymon, giving Ollie's daughter the opportunity to play with other girls, as mixed basketball was not allowed after the age of 15. In their first season, the team won the U16 National title.

Elite academy
The club is partnered with Itchen College, with whom they offer elite level, under-19 basketball development to some of the county's top male and female players.

Senior teams
The Kestrels, currently in partnership with Solent University, offers senior basketball with four teams playing at National League level.

The men's senior team, established in 2012, are the current National Basketball League League and Playoffs champions, the second tier of British men's basketball. In 2020, the Kestrels became the first-ever NBL team to reach the semi-finals of a top-tier British Basketball League competition, the BBL Trophy, and eventually finished as runners-up, losing to the Newcastle Eagles 96-94 after overtime in the final.

Men's team

Honours
 National Cup Champions (2): 2019-20 , 2021-22  
 National League Division 1 League Champions (4): 2018-19, 2019-20, 2020-21, 2021-22
 National League Division 1 Playoffs Champions (3): 2018-19, 2020-21, 2021-22
 National Trophy Champions (1): 2017-18 
 National League Division 2 League Champions (1): 2015-16
 National League Division 3 South League Champions (1): 2014-15
 L Lynch Trophy Champions (1): 2020-21

Players
Notable former players              

   Joel Freeland
   Will Neighbour
  Jeremy Sochan

Season-by-season records

Record in BBL competitions

Women's team
Honours
 National League Division 1 League Champions (1): 2016-17

See also

References

Basketball teams in England
Sport in Southampton
Basketball teams established in 1998
1998 establishments in England